The capture of HMS Cyane and HMS Levant was an action which took place at the end of the Anglo-US portion of the War of 1812. The two British warships  and  fought  on 20 February 1815, about 100 miles east of Madeira. Following exchanges of broadsides and musket fire, both Cyane and Levant surrendered. The war had actually finished a few days before the action with the ratification of the Treaty of Ghent by both sides, but the combatants were not aware of this.

Constitution and the two prizes anchored in Porto Praya in the Cape Verde islands. Levant failed to escape when a British squadron appeared, and was recaptured.

Prelude
The US frigate Constitution, commanded by Captain Charles Stewart, had broken out of Boston late in 1814 in a westerly gale which blew the British blockading squadron under Captain Sir George Collier off station. Stewart then embarked on a commerce-raiding cruise which took Constitution to Bermuda, Madeira, the coast of Portugal and finally back towards Madeira.

At 1:00 pm on 20 February 1815, two ships were sighted to the south, and Stewart set all sail in chase, in an easterly wind. The two ships were the sixth-rate   (sometimes referred to as a "corvette"), commanded by Captain Gordon Thomas Falcon, and the Cyrus class ship-sloop (also a sixth-rate) , commanded by Captain the Honourable George Douglass. Cyane was armed with 22 32-pounder carronades, 10 18-pounder carronades, and two 12-pounder long guns, the slightly lighter Levant had 18 32-pounder carronades, 2 6-pounder long guns, and a shifting 12-pounder. The crews of the two British vessels totaled 310.

Constitution carried a main battery of 30 24-pounder long guns, and 20 or 22 32-pounder carronades and two long bow-chasers Having earlier detached 20 men to a prize, she had a crew of 410 officers and seamen and 41 Marines.

Comparison of force
(English measurement methods used for the three ships)

Action
The two British ships were at first widely separated. Cyane increased sail to close on the Levant and by 5:30 pm, the two British ships were within hail of each other. The two captains resolved to fight rather than split up and try to escape. They at first tried to delay battle until after nightfall, but Constitution was approaching too rapidly and they formed on the starboard tack in line ahead, with Levant a cable's length  ahead of Cyane. The combined broadsides of the two British ships were slightly heavier than Constitutions, but were fired almost exclusively from short-range carronades, and at the range at which the action commenced, the effect of Constitutions main deck battery of 24-pounder long guns was decisive against the lighter structure and short range armament of the British vessels.

At 6:10 pm, the action began, with Constitution to windward, Levant on her port bow and Cyane on her port quarter. After broadsides had been exchanged for quarter of an hour, the cloud of smoke from the firing which gathered under Constitutions lee hid the British ships from view. Stewart ordered his crew to cease fire, and the smoke cleared in time to allow the US crewmen to see Cyane attempting to cross their stern and rake Constitution. Stewart ordered the sails to be thrown aback, and Constitution instead raked Cyane. As Levant tried to cross Constitutions bows, Stewart ordered the sails to be filled again, and raked Levant from astern. As Levant drifted downwind with battered rigging, Constitution turned again to engage Cyane. At 6:50, Cyane struck her colours.

Lieutenant Hoffman, the second lieutenant of Constitution, took command of Cyane. At 8:00 pm, Stewart set off to pursue Levant, and at 8:50 discovered the British vessel beating back upwind to re-enter the fight, unaware that Cyane had surrendered. The two vessels exchanged broadsides on opposite tacks. Captain Douglass then attempted to escape upwind but at 9:30, Levant was overtaken and also forced to surrender.

Although it was acknowledged that the crews of both British ships had fought determinedly and skilfully, Stewart's ship-handling had been faultless.

Casualties
The US side lost 6 men killed and 9 wounded. Aboard Cyane, 12 men were killed and 26 wounded, some of whom later died of their injuries. Aboard Levant, 7 men were killed and 16 wounded.

It was stated by the British officers, at the court-martial, that the crews of Cyane and Levant were for three weeks kept constantly in the Constitution's hold, with both hands and legs in irons, and allowed but three pints of water during twenty-four hours. It was further proved that, after the expiration of three weeks, upon the application of Captain Douglas, one third of the men were allowed to be on deck, four hours out of twenty-four, but had not the means of walking, being still in leg irons; that on mustering the crews when they landed at Maranham, five of the Levant's boys were missing; that, upon application and search for them, two were found locked up in the US captain of marine's cabin.

Recapture of Levant
Constitution and the two prizes made for Porto Praya in the Cape Verde islands, which were neutral Portuguese territory. They reached there on 10 March. While repairs were being made to all three ships and Stewart was preparing to send off the prisoners in a neutral cartel, a large ship was sighted making for the anchorage. Stewart was preparing to engage when two more heavy ships were sighted, clearly too powerful a force for Constitution to face. Stewart believed that the Portuguese would be unable to enforce their neutrality and his three ships hastily left the harbour.

The approaching ships were Collier's squadron, which had recrossed the Atlantic once Collier had discovered that Constitution had escaped from Boston. Leander and Newcastle had been constructed in 1813 with 24-pounder main deck broadsides specifically to match the large US frigates.

As the British pursued, Constitution was forced to cut away the boats which the frigate had been towing. Cyane dropped back and Stewart ordered her to tack. She did so, and escaped, being ignored by Collier's frigates. Levant, commanded by Lieutenant Ballard, first lieutenant of Constitution, also fell back, and turned back for Porto Praya. All three British frigates pursued her into the harbour and opened fire, while the British prisoners from Cyane and Levant seized a Portuguese shore battery and also opened fire on Levant. Although the cannonade was ineffectual, the odds were overwhelming and Ballard surrendered.

After calling at a Brazilian port, where Stewart released his remaining prisoners, Constitution reached Porto Rico where Stewart learned that the war had ended some days before he had fought. Cyane reached New York without incident. The Portuguese later paid compensation to the United States for their failure to enforce their neutrality which allowed the recapture of Levant. Sir George Collier was accused of cowardice or incompetence for his failure to engage Constitution at Porto Praya, and killed himself in 1824.

Notes
Footnotes

Citations

Sources

Indiana University, Lily Library, A.Y. Humphreys journal, Humphreys Manuscripts.

External links
What It was Like to be shot up by Old ironsides American Heritage April/May 1983 Vol 34 Issue 3
 
 Link to after-action reports by Captain Charles Stewart, USS Constitution, and A.Y. Humphreys, Chaplain, USS Constitution

 

Naval battles of the War of 1812
February 1815 events